Cruz López Aguilar (May 3, 1947 - August 28, 2021) is a Mexican politician affiliated with the Institutional Revolutionary Party. As of 2014 he served as Deputy of the LIX and LXI Legislatures of the Mexican Congress as a plurinominal representative.

References

1947 births
Living people
Politicians from Nuevo León
Members of the Chamber of Deputies (Mexico)
Institutional Revolutionary Party politicians
21st-century Mexican politicians
Deputies of the LXI Legislature of Mexico